Adenodolichos rupestris is a plant in the legume family Fabaceae, native to tropical Africa. The specific epithet means "found near rocks", referring to where the species was initially encountered.

Description
Inflorescences, in racemes, feature purplish flowers.

Distribution and habitat
Adenodolichos rupestris is native to Tanzania and Zambia. The species was initially found on rocks at a waterfall.

References

rupestris
Flora of Tanzania
Flora of Zambia
Plants described in 1971
Taxa named by Bernard Verdcourt